Lactoylphenylalanine, or Lac-Phe, is a metabolite generated by intense exercise. In mice, high levels of Lac-Phe in the blood cause a decrease of food intake. In mammals it is created from (S)-lactate and L-phenylalanine by the cytosol nonspecific dipeptidase (CNDP2) protein. It is classified as N-acyl-alpha-amino acid and pseudodipeptide.

It has also been reported that as an additive N-L-lactoyl phenylalanine improves the taste of food, conferring an umami flavor. It is found naturally in significant amounts in some traditional Chinese fermented foods such as preserved pickles and soy sauce.

See also 
 Acyl group
 Lactoyl, the acyl group derived from lactic acid
 Alpha-amino acid
 Dipeptide
 Dipeptidase

References

External links 

 

Amino acid derivatives
Carboxamides
Obesity